Of Time and Stars is a collection of  science fiction short stories by British writer Arthur C. Clarke, containing an introduction by J. B. Priestley.
 
The stories all originally appeared in a number of different publications including the periodicals Dude, The Evening Standard, Lilliput, The Magazine of Fantasy & Science Fiction, Future, New Worlds, Startling Stories, Astounding, Fantasy, King's College Review, Satellite, Amazing Stories, London Evening News, Infinity Science Fiction and Ten Story Fantasy as well as the anthologies Star Science Fiction Stories No.1 edited by Frederik Pohl and Time to Come edited by August Derleth.

Contents
This collection, originally published in 1972, includes:

 Introduction by J.B. Priestley
 Foreword
 "The Nine Billion Names of God"
 "An Ape About the House"
 "Green Fingers"
 "Trouble with the Natives"
 "Into the Comet"
 "No Morning After"
 "If I Forget Thee, Oh Earth"
 "Who's There?"
 "All the Time in the World"
 "Hide and Seek"
 "Robin Hood, F.R.S."
 "The Fires Within"
 "The Forgotten Enemy"
 "The Reluctant Orchid"
 "Encounter at Dawn"
 "Security Check"
 "Feathered Friend"
 "The Sentinel"
 Bibliography: Books by Arthur C. Clarke

References

External links 
 

1972 short story collections
Short story collections by Arthur C. Clarke